In total, 43 individuals in the military of allies of Nazi Germany were awarded the Knight's Cross of the Iron Cross (German: Ritterkreuz des Eisernen Kreuzes), the highest award in the military of Nazi Germany during World War II. Eight of these men were also honoured with the next higher grade, the Oak Leaves to the Knight's Cross, and one senior naval officer, Fleet Admiral Isoroku Yamamoto, was additionally awarded the Swords to the Knight's Cross with Oak Leaves. Among the recipients were eighteen Romanians, nine Italians, eight Hungarians, two Slovaks, two Japanese, two Spaniards, two Finns, one Dutch man, and one Belgian.

Colonel General Dezső László of Hungary became the last foreign recipient of the award on 3 March 1945. The last surviving foreign recipient of the award was Belgian politician Léon Degrelle, who died on 31 March 1994, fifty years after receiving the medal from Hitler's hands.

Background
The Oberkommando der Wehrmacht kept separate Knight's Cross lists, one for each of the  military branches, Heer (Army), Kriegsmarine (Navy), Luftwaffe (Air force) and for the Waffen-SS. Within each of these lists a unique sequential number was assigned to each recipient. The same numbering paradigm was applied to the higher grades of the Knight's Cross, one list per grade. Once the four lists of the Knight's Cross recipients were merged into one listing, the chronological order was abandoned and the list was converted to an alphabetical list of recipients. Foreign recipients were never integrated into this list. The Wehrmacht also refrained from assigning a numbering scheme to the different lists of foreign recipients. Two principles were retained: the foreign Knights Cross recipients were ordered alphabetically and the recipients of the higher grades were ordered chronologically.

The Knight's Cross of the Iron Cross and its higher grades were based on four separate enactments. The first enactment Reichsgesetzblatt I S. 1573 of 1 September 1939 instituted the Iron Cross (Eisernes Kreuz) and the Knight's Cross of the Iron Cross. As the war progressed, some of the recipients distinguished themselves further and a higher grade, the Oak Leaves to Knight's Cross of the Iron Cross, was instituted. The Oak Leaves, as they were commonly referred to, were based on the enactment Reichsgesetzblatt I S. 849 of 3 June 1940. In 1941, two higher grades of the Knight's Cross were instituted. The enactment Reichsgesetzblatt I S. 613 of 28 September 1941 introduced the Knight's Cross of the Iron Cross with Oak Leaves and Swords and the Knight's Cross of the Iron Cross with Oak Leaves, Swords and Diamonds. At the end of 1944 the final grade, the Knight's Cross of the Iron Cross with Golden Oak Leaves, Swords, and Diamonds (Ritterkreuz des Eisernen Kreuzes mit goldenem Eichenlaub, Schwertern und Brillanten), based on the enactment Reichsgesetzblatt 1945 I S. 11 of 29 December 1944, concluded the variants of the Knight's Cross.

Recipients
The recipients of the Knight's Cross of the Iron Cross are initially ordered alphabetically whereas the recipients of the higher grades are initially ordered chronologically. The rank listed is the recipient's rank at the time the Knight's Cross or the Oak Leaves were awarded.

Recipients of the Knight's Cross of the Iron Cross with Oak Leaves and Swords
The Knight's Cross with Oak Leaves and Swords is based on the enactment Reichsgesetzblatt I S. 613 of 28 September 1941 to reward those servicemen who had already been awarded the Oak Leaves to the Knight's Cross of the Iron Cross. Isoroku Yamamoto was the sole non-German combatant to be honoured with the Swords to the Knight's Cross with Oak Leaves.

Recipients of the Knight's Cross of the Iron Cross with Oak Leaves
The Knight's Cross with Oak Leaves was based on the enactment Reichsgesetzblatt I S. 849 of 3 June 1940.

Recipients of the Knight's Cross of the Iron Cross
The Knight's Cross of the Iron Cross is based on the enactment Reichsgesetzblatt I S. 1573 of 1 September 1939 Verordnung über die Erneuerung des Eisernen Kreuzes (Regulation of the renewing of the Iron Cross).

Notes

References

Citations

Bibliography

External links

Lists of Knight's Cross of the Iron Cross recipients